Jolene Blalock (born March 5, 1975) is an American actress and model. She is best known for playing Vulcan first officer and science officer T'Pol on the UPN science-fiction series Star Trek: Enterprise. Her other work includes guest-star appearances on television series and in films.

Early life
Blalock was born and raised in San Diego, California, with three siblings. She spent her childhood surfing and developing artistic skills.

Career

Early work
Blalock left home at age 17 to model in Europe and Asia. She has appeared on the cover of many men's lifestyle magazines, was twice featured in Maxim'''s "Girls of Maxim" gallery, and was named the 10th sexiest woman in the world in 2003 by FHM. She posed for a clothed fashion layout in Playboy in April 2002, and was later interviewed by the magazine for its "20Q" section in February 2005.

She made her television debut on the sitcom Veronica's Closet, before guest appearances on Love Boat: The Next Wave, CSI: Crime Scene Investigation, and JAG. She starred as Medea in a television movie adaptation of Jason and the Argonauts (2000). She also appeared in the movie On the Edge (2001) and the miniseries The Diamond Hunters (2001) before being cast on Star Trek: Enterprise. She appeared in the music video "Denise" (1999) by Fountains of Wayne.

Star Trek: Enterprise (2001–2005)
Landing one of the leading roles on Star Trek: Enterprise was Blalock's biggest break. About her time on the show, she recalled:

In Enterprise, Blalock played Subcommander T'Pol, a Vulcan diplomat on Earth who was initially assigned by Vulcan Ambassador Soval (a recurring role played by Gary Graham) as an observer on the ship's first mission, in the pilot episode "Broken Bow".  At the end of that episode, she is asked to remain on Enterprise as its Science Officer by Captain Jonathan Archer (played by Scott Bakula). As the series progressed, she assumed the position of First Officer, and at the start of the third season Xindi arc, she resigns her Vulcan position to remain on Enterprise when the Vulcan High Command orders her back to Vulcan. Early in the fourth season, she formalizes her position in Starfleet and is granted a field commission of Commander, retaining her role as the ship's First Officer, where she remained for the rest of the series.

Blalock has not participated in conventions or given interviews regarding her role on Star Trek: Enterprise except for FedCon XIV in May 2005, but did agree to join a 2013 cast reunion for an interview during the Blu-ray conversion and production. She also appeared as a parody version of herself attending a Star Trek convention in a 2009 episode of the sitcom 10 Items or Less titled "Star Trok."

Attending her first Trek event in almost a decade, Blalock walked the red carpet for 2021's Star Trek Day on September 8, 2021.

2003–present
Blalock appeared in the film Slow Burn, which was shot in 2003 between seasons two and three of Enterprise, unveiled at the Toronto International Film Festival in September 2005, and finally saw limited theatrical release in 2007.

She guest-starred in two episodes of Stargate SG-1 as Ishta, leader of a group of rebel female warriors.

Blalock was scheduled to appear on an episode of Lost during the 2005–2006 season. Though she filmed some scenes, they were never used in an episode nor featured as "deleted scenes" in the DVD set's bonus material. Set photos from the shooting of a scene surfaced in 2008.

In Starship Troopers 3: Marauder, which was released direct-to-video on August 5, 2008, Blalock played Captain Lola Beck who led a mixed group of survivors on a journey across an alien infested wasteland.

Blalock played Alexa, the wife of a hospitalized porn star, in the 2009 episode "Teamwork" on the series House.

In the second season of Legend of the Seeker, appearing in the January 2009 episodes "Dark" and "Perdition", Blalock played Sister Nicci, a Sister of the Dark.

Blalock had a supporting role as Stacy in the action thriller Sinners and Saints (2010).

Personal life
Blalock is married to Michael Rapino, CEO of Live Nation. Rapino lived in England while Blalock lived in the U.S. while working on Star Trek: Enterprise. She proposed to him and they married in Negril, Jamaica, on April 22, 2003. They have three sons, born in 2010, 2012, and 2014. Rapino and Blalock founded the Rapino Foundation, which helps populations in the developing world.

Blalock is a dog fancier and has appeared on the cover of the UK's K9 Magazine''.

Filmography

Film

Television

References

External links 

 

1975 births
Living people
Actresses from San Diego
American film actresses
Female models from California
American television actresses
20th-century American actresses
21st-century American actresses